Adhanur is a village in the Vedaranyam taluk of Nagapattinam district, Tamil Nadu, India.

Demographics 

As per the 2001 census, Achampatti had a total population of 2587 with 1327 males and 1260 females. The sex ratio was 950. The literacy rate was 64.53.

References 

 

Villages in Thanjavur district